Andy Ardiyansah (born September 25, 1978, in Jakarta) is a beach volleyball player from Indonesia. He competed at the 2006 Asian Games and got a gold medal at the 2008 Asian Beach Games, with his partner Koko Prasetyo Darkuncoro.

References

1978 births
Living people
Indonesian beach volleyball players
Men's beach volleyball players
Beach volleyball players at the 2002 Asian Games
Beach volleyball players at the 2006 Asian Games
Beach volleyball players at the 2010 Asian Games
Southeast Asian Games gold medalists for Indonesia
Southeast Asian Games medalists in volleyball
Competitors at the 2005 Southeast Asian Games
Competitors at the 2007 Southeast Asian Games
Competitors at the 2009 Southeast Asian Games
Competitors at the 2011 Southeast Asian Games
Asian Games competitors for Indonesia
21st-century Indonesian people